Princess Sasibongse Prabai or Phra Chao Boromwongse Ther Phra Ong Chao Sasibongse Prabai (RTGS: Sasiphong Praphai) (26 April 1881 – 31 May 1934), was a Princess of Siam (later Thailand. She was a member of Siamese Royal Family. She is a daughter of Chulalongkorn, King Rama V of Siam.

Her mother was Chao Chom Manda Chan, daughter of Lord (Phraya) Rajasam Bharakorn. Princess Sasibongse Prabai died on 31 May 1934, at the age of 53.

Ancestry

1881 births
1934 deaths
19th-century Thai women
19th-century Chakri dynasty
20th-century Thai women
20th-century Chakri dynasty
Thai female Phra Ong Chao
Dames Grand Commander of the Order of Chula Chom Klao
Children of Chulalongkorn
Daughters of kings